Jones Mwewa (12 March 1973 – 18 November 2011) was a Zambian footballer who was part of the Zambian squad that finished third in the 1996 African Cup of Nations.

Career
Mwewa played club football for Railway Express Power Dynamos and Konkola Blades.

Mwewa made several appearances for the Zambia national football team, including 13 FIFA World Cup qualifying matches. He also participated for Zambia at the 2000 African Cup of Nations and 2002 African Cup of Nations finals.

Death
Mwewa died suddenly on 18 November 2011 at the age of 38.

References

External links

1973 births
2011 deaths
Zambian footballers
Zambia international footballers
1996 African Cup of Nations players
2000 African Cup of Nations players
2002 African Cup of Nations players
People from Ndola
Power Dynamos F.C. players
Association football defenders